Christine Hunschofsky is an American politician from the state of Florida. A Democrat, she has been a member of the Florida House of Representatives since 2020, after serving as the mayor of Parkland from 2017 to 2020.

Early life 

Hunschofsky grew up in Boston, and graduated from Boston University with a focus on Business Administration and Philosophy.

Political career

Mayor of Parkland
After moving to Parkland, Hunschofsky became involved with the community. She was a member of the Parkland Education Advisory Board for 7 years, wrote for Parkland Life Magazine, and was involved with the Mary Help of Christians Catholic Church. She was elected City Commissioner in 2012 with 84 percent of the vote, and in 2016 ran for Mayor of Parkland and won with 76 percent of the vote.

Hunschofsky was mayor on February 14, 2018, when 17 were killed and another 17 were wounded in a mass shooting at Marjory Stoneman Douglas High School in Parkland. Afterward, she and other mayors went to Washington, D.C. to lobby the federal government for stricter background checks for those purchasing guns, and other gun control measures. Their efforts were not successful, and no bill was passed at the time.

Hunschofsky spoke at a community event on the anniversary of the shooting, saying "While we are still healing, while a lot of this is still raw, to see the human spirit that we have here in Parkland, I think that's the message. We might have been shaken but we refuse to be down for the count."

Florida House of Representatives
In 2020 she ran for Kristin Jacobs' vacated Florida House District 96 seat, receiving an endorsement from 2020 Presidential candidate Pete Buttigieg, as well as local officials such as Florida Senator Kevin Rader and Representatives Dan Daley, Michael Gottlieb, and Tina Polsky, in addition to many other Florida politicians, including many mayors. She also received an endorsement from Fred Guttenberg, the father of one of the Parkland Shooting victims, who praised Hunschofsky for being "truly there for our community" and working "tirelessly to guide our city through its darkest days." She won the primary election with 72.2% of the vote to her opponent Saima Farooqui's 20.7%, who also ran against Kristin Jacobs in 2018. Hunschofsky faced no Republican opponent in the general election.

Elections

References

21st-century American politicians
21st-century American women politicians
Babson College alumni
Boston University alumni
Living people
Democratic Party members of the Florida House of Representatives
Politicians from Boston
Stoneman Douglas High School shooting
Women mayors of places in Florida
Women state legislators in Florida
Year of birth missing (living people)